Tin Latt may refer to:

 Tin Latt (diplomat) (born 1949), Burmese physician and diplomat
 Tin Latt (minister), Burmese politician and incumbent deputy minister